Zistersdorf is a town in the district of Gänserndorf in the Austrian state of Lower Austria.

Population

References

External links
Municipal website

Cities and towns in Gänserndorf District